Trigonostemon fragilis is a species of plant in the family Euphorbiaceae. It is endemic to Vietnam.

References

Crotonoideae
Vulnerable plants
Endemic flora of Vietnam
Taxonomy articles created by Polbot